The Ellen is a river in the English county of Cumbria, flowing from Skiddaw in the Northern Fells to the Solway Firth at Maryport. It was historically in the county of Cumberland.

Course

The river rises on the Skiddaw massif, and runs in a generally westerly direction, passing Uldale, Ireby, Boltongate, Baggrow and Blennerhasset parish boundary and Aspatria. From there, it continues southwest (instead of more northwesterly) past Oughterside, Gilcrux, Bullgill, Crosby and Dearham, and skirts the grounds of Netherhall School before flowing into the Solway Firth at Maryport.

Fish
The river contains populations of brown trout, eels, lamprey, minnows, salmon, sea trout, and stickleback.

Tributaries
 Dash Beck
 Gill Gooden
 Row Beck

References

Ellen